Juliana Martins (born March 3, 1974 in Rio de Janeiro) is a Brazilian television actress and model.

Partial Television jobs
A Gata Comeu (1985)
Churrascaria Brasil (1987) (film)
Kananga do Japão (1989)
Riacho Doce (1990)
Vamp (1991)
Malhação (1995)
A Vida Como Ela É (1996)
Zazá (1997)
Vila Madalena (2000)
Coração de Estudante (2002)
Belíssima (2005)	
Pé na Jaca (2006)	
Caminhos do Coração (2007)

External links
 

1974 births
Living people
Actresses from Rio de Janeiro (city)
Brazilian telenovela actresses
Brazilian female models
Brazilian television actresses